Eppleworth is a hamlet in the East Riding of Yorkshire, England. Further west along Westfields Road lies Raywell.

Eppleworth forms part of the civil parish of Skidby.

In 1823 Baine's History, Directory and Gazetteer of the County of York gave Eppleworth's name as 'Epplewith'. At the time it was in the parish of Skidby and the Wapentake of Harthill. Recorded in the hamlet were a farmer and a yeoman.

References

Hamlets in the East Riding of Yorkshire